The canton of La Flèche is an administrative division of the Sarthe department, northwestern France. Its borders were modified at the French canton reorganisation which came into effect in March 2015. Its seat is in La Flèche.

It consists of the following communes:
 
Arthezé
Bazouges Cré sur Loir
Bousse
La Chapelle-d'Aligné
Clermont-Créans
Courcelles-la-Forêt
Crosmières
La Flèche
Ligron
Mareil-sur-Loir
Thorée-les-Pins
Villaines-sous-Malicorne

References

Cantons of Sarthe